155 mm (6.1 in) is a NATO-standard artillery caliber that is used in many field guns, howitzers, and gun-howitzers. It is defined in AOP-29 part 1 with reference to STANAG 4425.

Land warfare

The caliber originated in France after it was defeated in the Franco-Prussian War of 1870–1871. A French artillery committee met on 2 February 1874 to discuss new models for French fortress and siege artillery, among which there was a weapon in the  caliber range (later it became known as the De Bange 155 mm cannon). After several meetings, on 16 April 1874 the committee settled on the 15.5 cm caliber (in the subsequent program-letter of the committee, dating from 21 April 1874, the caliber was for the first time expressed as 155 mm).

Since the early 21st century, most NATO armies have adopted 155 mm weapons as an all-purpose standard. They are seen as striking a good compromise between range and power, while using just a single caliber greatly simplifies the logistics burden. This has led to the obsolescence of larger caliber artillery weapons such as the 175 mm (6.9 in) and 203 mm (8 in). Some militaries retain the smaller 105 mm (4.1 in) weapons for their light weight and portability. Russian artillery and those of former Eastern Bloc countries tend to use the 122 mm (4.8 in), 130 mm (5.1 in) and 152 mm (6.0 in) artillery weapons in similar roles.

Naval warfare
Since the end of WWII, 155 mm has not found any use among naval forces despite its ubiquity on land, with most NATO and aligned navies using 76 mm (3 in), 100 mm (3.9 in), 114 mm (4.5 in), or 127 mm (5 in) guns on modern warships. At one point the British Ministry of Defence studied "up-gunning" the Royal Navy's 4.5 inch Mark 8 naval guns to give increased firepower and a common caliber between the Royal Navy and the British Army. However, despite superficially appearing to be inferior based on a simple comparison of round diameters, when firing conventional ammunition the smaller, 4.5 inch Mark 8 naval gun is comparable to the standard 155 mm gun-howitzer of the British Army. The standard shell from a 4.5 inch Mark 8 naval gun has the same, if not better, range. Only by using rocket-assisted projectiles (RAPs) can most 155 mm guns have comparable range to the 4.5 inch Mark 8 naval gun and by doing so there is a reduction in the payload. This is because naval guns can be built much more strongly than land-based self-propelled gun-howitzers, and have much longer barrels in relation to caliber (for example the 4.5 inch Mark 8 naval gun has a barrel length of 55 calibers, while the standard AS-90 self-propelled gun has a barrel length of 39 calibers). This allows naval guns to fire heavier shells in comparison to shell diameter and to use larger propellant charges in relation to shell weight leading to greater projectile velocities. In addition, even without active cooling, the heavier naval gun barrels allow a faster sustained rate of fire than field guns, and this is exploited with an autoloading system with a capacity of several hundred rounds. The 155 mm is better than the 4.5 inch Mark 8 naval gun for firing cannon-launched guided projectiles (CLGP) as the lower velocity of the 155 mm shell makes it much easier for the projectiles' internal electronic guidance systems to survive being fired.

While the US Navy's Advanced Gun System (AGS) also uses a 155 mm caliber, it is not compatible with NATO-standard 155 mm ammunition. However, only one type of ammunition was ever developed, and procurement was discontinued in 2016 due to its high cost, making the AGS unusable.

155 mm guns

 GC-45
 PLZ-45
 PLZ-05
 155 GH 52 APU
 Canon de 155 mm GPF ( - no longer in service)
 Canon de 155 C modèle 1915 St. Chamond ( - no longer in service)
 Canon de 155 C modèle 1917 Schneider ( - no longer in service)
 Obusier de 155 mm Modèle 50 ( - no longer in service)
 TRF1
 PzH2000
 FH70 ( /  / )
 Dhanush
 DRDO Advanced Towed Artillery Gun System (ATAGS)
 ATMOS 2000
 Soltam M-68  ( - no longer in service)
 Soltam M-71
 Type 75
 Type 99
 2S19M1-155
 Nora B-52
 G5/G6
 Bandkanon 1 ( - no longer in service) 
 T-155 Fırtına
 M777
 M1/M2 155 mm "Long Tom" ( - no longer in service)
 M12 ( - no longer in service)
 M41 ( - no longer in service)
 M44 ( - no longer in service)
 M53
 M109
 M114
 M198
 XM1203 ( – never entered service)
 XM2001 ( – never entered service)
Firing NATO projectiles
 CAESAR
 GCT
 Palmaria
 AHS Krab 
 FH-88 ( - no longer in service)
 FH-2000
 SLWH Pegasus
 SSPH Primus
 155 mm SpGH Zuzana
 KH179
 K9 Thunder
 Santa Bárbara Sistemas 155/52
 Archer Artillery System
 FH77 B
 Panter howitzer
 2S22 Bohdana
 AS90/AHS Krab
Incompatible with NATO projectiles
 Advanced Gun System (AGS) - no ammunition available
 FH77 A

155 mm naval guns

 Canon de 155 mm Modèle 1920 ( – non-NATO compatible)
 15.5 cm/60 3rd Year Type naval gun ( – non-NATO compatible)
 Advanced Gun System ( – in service but with no ammunition available; non-NATO compatible)
 Mark 8 gun ( – proposed but never produced, NATO compatible)

155 mm shells

References

155 mm artillery
Artillery
Ammunition